The canton of Templeuve-en-Pévèle (before 2021: Templeuve) is an administrative division of the Nord department, northern France. It was created at the French canton reorganisation which came into effect in March 2015. Its seat is in Templeuve-en-Pévèle.

It consists of the following communes:

Anstaing
Attiches
Avelin
Bachy
Baisieux
Bersée
Bourghelles
Bouvines
Camphin-en-Pévèle
Cappelle-en-Pévèle
Chéreng
Cobrieux
Cysoing
Ennevelin
Fretin
Genech
Gruson
Lesquin
Louvil
Mérignies
Moncheaux
Mons-en-Pévèle
Mouchin
La Neuville
Péronne-en-Mélantois
Pont-à-Marcq
Sainghin-en-Mélantois
Templeuve-en-Pévèle
Thumeries
Tourmignies
Tressin
Wannehain

References

Cantons of Nord (French department)